In genetics and especially genetic engineering, deletion mapping is a technique used to find out the mutation sites within a gene. 

The principle of deletion mapping involves crossing a strain which has a point mutation in a gene, with multiple strains who each carry a deletion in a different region of the same gene. Wherever recombination occurs between the two strains to produce a wild-type (+) gene (regardless of frequency), the point mutation cannot lie within the region of the deletion. If recombination cannot produce any wild-type genes, then it is reasonable to conclude that the point mutation and deletion are found within the same stretch of DNA.

This example should demonstrate how the principle works:

Suppose you have a gene X, which in wild-type (+) form can be shown linearly like so:

5'-------------------------------------------------------------------------------------------------------------------3' gene X, +

Suppose a strain of organisms has a point mutation in the gene (now called gene X, – to denote that it is no longer wild-type):

5'----------------------------------------------------X--------------------------------------------------------------3' gene X, –

Now suppose you have two strains of organisms, each with deletions in gene X at different sites, called del-1 and del-2, respectively (the dotted line indicates the site of deletion):

5'-------------------(..............................................)------------------------------------------------3' del-1

5'------------------------------------------------------------(............................................)---------3' del-2

Because the point mutation lies within the deletion of del-1, there will be no wild-type (+) recombinants between the point mutant and the del-1 mutant. However, in a cross between the point mutant and the del-2 mutant, there could be a successful wild-type (+) recombinant produced.

In genetic recombination, if a mutant allele in the donor is within the sequence corresponding to the region deleted in the recipient, then no (+) recombinants will be obtained (as in the cross with del-1). To repair a deletion by recombination, the donor must have wild-type DNA sequence in the region corresponding to the DNA deleted in the recipient (as in the cross against del-2). In other words, there is a feasible recombination possibility between the point mutant and del-2 in which a length of DNA could be made that contained neither the point mutation, nor the deletion, indicating that the mutations in these two strains cannot be in the same region.

Note that not all crossovers between the point mutant and del-2 will yield (+) recombinants; in this case only those crossover events that occur between the point mutant and the 5' end of the deletion would inherit the wild-type sequence.

Genetic engineering